Dűrrũ Sade (born 1902, date of death unknown) was a Turkish wrestler. He competed in the Greco-Roman middleweight event at the 1924 Summer Olympics.

References

External links
 

1902 births
Olympic wrestlers of Turkey
Place of birth missing
Turkish male sport wrestlers
Wrestlers at the 1924 Summer Olympics
Year of death missing
20th-century Turkish people